Women First is a 1924 American silent drama film directed by B. Reeves Eason and starring William Fairbanks, Eva Novak and Lydia Knott.

Cast
 William Fairbanks as Billy 
 Eva Novak as Jennie 
 Lydia Knott as Mrs. Abigail Doon 
 Bob Rhodes as Johnny Doon 
 Lloyd Whitlock as Harvey Boyd 
 Andrew Waldron as Judge Weatherfax 
 Dan Crimmins as Amos Snivens 
 William J. Dyer as Sheriff 
 Max Asher as H.L.S.J. Lee 
 Merta Sterling as Mandy Lee 
 Jack Richardson as Madden 
 William A. Carroll as Stableman

References

Bibliography
 Bernard F. Dick. Columbia Pictures: Portrait of a Studio. University Press of Kentucky, 2015.

External links
 

1924 films
1924 drama films
1920s English-language films
American silent feature films
Silent American drama films
American black-and-white films
Films directed by B. Reeves Eason
Columbia Pictures films
1920s American films